The Roman Catholic Archdiocese of Goiânia is an archdiocese located in the city of Goiânia in Brazil.

History
 March 26, 1956: Established as Metropolitan Archdiocese of Goiânia from the Metropolitan Archdiocese of Goiás

Special churches
Minor Basilica:
Basílica do Divino Pai Eterno, Trindade

Bishops
(all Roman Rite)

Episcopal ordinaries
 Fernando Gomes dos Santos (7 March 1957 – 1 June 1985)
 Antônio Ribeiro de Oliveira (23 October 1985 – 8 May 2002)
 Washington Cruz, CP (8 May 2002 – 9 December 2021)
 João Justino de Medeiros Silva (9 December 2021 – present)

Auxiliary bishops
Antônio Ribeiro de Oliveira (1975-1985), appointed Archbishop here
Waldemar Passini Dalbello (2009-2014), appointed Coadjutor Bishop of Luziânia, Goias
Levi Bonatto, Opus Dei (2014-
Moacir Silva Arantes (2016-2020), appointed Bishop of Barreiras

Suffragan dioceses
 Diocese of Anápolis  
 Diocese of Goiás
 Diocese of Ipameri
 Diocese of Itumbiara
 Diocese of Jataí
 Diocese of Rubiataba–Mozarlândia
 Diocese of São Luís de Montes Belos

Sources
 GCatholic.org
 Catholic Hierarchy
  Archdiocese website (Portuguese)

Roman Catholic dioceses in Brazil
Roman Catholic ecclesiastical provinces in Brazil
 
Christian organizations established in 1956
Roman Catholic dioceses and prelatures established in the 20th century